The discography of Alter Bridge, an American rock band, includes seven studio albums, four live albums, one box set, one extended play (EP), 26 singles, two video albums and 14 music videos. Formed in Orlando, Florida, in 2004, Alter Bridge consists of Myles Kennedy and former Creed members Mark Tremonti, Brian Marshall and Scott Phillips. The band released its debut album One Day Remains in 2004, which reached number 5 on the US Billboard 200 and was certified gold by the RIAA. Two of the three singles from the album – "Open Your Eyes" and "Find the Real" – reached the top ten of the Billboard Mainstream Rock chart.

After signing with Universal Republic Records, the group released Blackbird in 2007, which peaked at number 13 on the US Billboard 200. Lead single "Rise Today" reached number 2 on the Mainstream Rock chart, while "Ties That Bind" reached number 2 on the UK Rock & Metal Singles Chart. Alter Bridge's first video Live from Amsterdam reached number 6 on the Billboard Music Video Sales chart in 2009. The band's third album AB III, issued by Roadrunner Records in 2010, reached number 17 on the Billboard 200 and the top ten of the UK Albums Chart. "Isolation" topped the US Billboard Mainstream Rock chart.

The band released its fourth studio album, Fortress, in 2013, which charted at number 12 on the Billboard 200 and number 6 on the UK Albums Chart. Their fifth studio album The Last Hero followed on Napalm Records in 2016, debuting at number 8 on the Billboard 200 (the band's first top ten on the chart since One Day Remains) and a career peak of number 3 in the UK. Alter Bridge's third and fourth live albums, Live at the O2 Arena + Rarities and Live at the Royal Albert Hall, were released in 2017 and 2018, both of which reached number 2 on the UK Rock & Metal Albums Chart. 2019's Walk the Sky reached number 16 in the US.

Albums

Studio albums

Live albums

Box sets

Extended plays

Singles

Promotional singles

Videos

Video albums

Music videos

References

External links
Alter Bridge official website
Alter Bridge discography at AllMusic
Alter Bridge discography at Discogs
Alter Bridge discography at MusicBrainz

Discography
Alter Bridge
Alter Bridge
Alter Bridge